A Moment of Happiness is a 2020 Malaysian Mandarin-language comedy film. In the film, a fake social media celebrity's relationship with a Thai boy goes online and becomes sensation. To keep their popularity, now her family have to hide the secret from the boyfriend and his family.

The film is released on 25 January 2020 in Malaysia and Singapore. It is one of the four 2020 Malaysian Chinese New Year films, including The God of Wealth, Fight Lah! Kopitiam, and Good Wealth 2020.

Synopsis

Cast 

 Lin Min Chen, as Zhen
 Tul Pakorn, as Nat
 Chan Fong, as Zhen's father
Mimi Chu
Danny One
Richard Ng
Thian Siew Kim
Susan Shaw
Happy Polla

References

External links 

2020 films
Malaysian comedy films
2020s Mandarin-language films
2020 comedy films
Films about social media